The  is a limited express train service operated in Japan by the private railway operator Keisei Electric Railway between  in Tokyo and  in Chiba Prefecture via the Keisei Main Line.

Service
The Cityliner service operates between Keisei Ueno Station and Keisei Narita Station, stopping at the following stations.

Rolling stock
Cityliner trains are formed of 8-car AE100 series electric multiple unit (EMU) trains previously used on Skyliner services. Smoking was prohibited in all cars from the start of the new services in July 2010.

The monoclass trainsets are formed as shown below, with car 1 at the Keisei Narita End.

 Car 4 is equipped with a toilet and wheelchair space.
 Car 5 has a drink vending machine.

History

2010
Cityliner services commenced on 17 July 2010, operating between Keisei Ueno and Narita Airport when the former Skyliner services were transferred to the new Narita Sky Access route.

2011
All seven Cityliner services daily were suspended following the Great East Japan earthquake of 11 March 2011 and subsequent energy restrictions implemented in the Tokyo area. Two services daily in either direction were however restored from 10 September 2011, following the lifting of energy restrictions.

2012
From the start of the revised timetable on 21 October 2012, Cityliner services were further cut back to just one return service daily operating between Keisei Ueno and Keisei Narita.

2015
From the start of the revised timetable on 5 December 2015, regular Cityliner services were discontinued, although seasonal services were scheduled to continue until the end of January 2016.

See also
 Narita Express, JR East service between Tokyo and Narita Airport

References

External links
 Keisei press release (May 2010) 

Keisei Electric Railway
Airport rail links in Japan
Named passenger trains of Japan
Rail transport in Chiba Prefecture
Railway services introduced in 2010
2010 establishments in Japan

ja:スカイライナー#シティライナー